
In basketball, points are the sum of the score accumulated through free throw or field goal. The National Collegiate Athletic Association's (NCAA) Division I scoring title is awarded to the player with the highest points per game (ppg) average in a given season. The NCAA did not split into its current divisions format until August 1973. From 1906 to 1955, there were no classifications to the NCAA nor its predecessor, the Intercollegiate Athletic Association of the United States (IAAUS). Then, from 1956 to 1973, colleges were classified as either "NCAA University Division (Major College)" or "NCAA College Division (Small College)". The NCAA's official men's basketball media guide recognizes scoring champions beginning with the 1947–48 season; from 1935–36 to 1946–47, "unofficial" scoring champions were compiled from the annual National Basketball Committee Official Basketball Guide.

Pete Maravich of LSU holds the all-time NCAA Division I records for career scoring (3,667) and average (44.2). His three consecutive scoring titles from 1968–1970 are also the three highest single-season averages in NCAA history.

Nine players have earned multiple scoring titles. The most recent player to accomplish this is Reggie Williams of Virginia Military Institute (2007, 2008). There have been two occurrences where, in back-to-back seasons, two different teammates have earned the NCAA scoring title. Frank Selvy and Darrell Floyd of Furman each won in 1954 and 1955, respectively, while Hank Gathers and Bo Kimble of Loyola Marymount won in 1989 and 1990, respectively.

Many of the scoring champions from the 1986–87 season and earlier could have added significantly more points if the three-point line had been instituted. It wasn't until the 1987–88 season that the NCAA standardized the line and accounted for three-point field goals in its official record book. The only player since they were instituted to have not made a single three-point shot in his scoring title season is Gathers, who instead made 419 field goals and 177 free throws en route to scoring 1,015 points and averaging 32.7 points per game.

One prolific college basketball scorer who was not an NCAA scoring champion was Notre Dame's Austin Carr. Carr averaged 38.2 ppg as a junior in 1969–70 (tied for eighth highest in NCAA history) and 38.0 ppg as a senior in 1970–71 (tenth highest). Unfortunately for Carr, he happened to accomplish these feats while playing at the same time as Maravich, whose 44.5 ppg in 1969–70 is the highest in Division I history, and as Johnny Neumann, whose 40.1 ppg in 1970–71 is the fifth highest average. While finishing second in the scoring races each of his last two seasons, Carr is the only player on the NCAA's top ten single season scoring averages list who never won an NCAA scoring title.

Key

Scoring leaders

Unofficial

Between 1935–36 and 1946–47, there were no "official" NCAA scoring champions. The statistics during that era were compiled from the National Basketball Committee Official Basketball Guide, which was not regulated by NCAA authorities. Therefore, the following players are included in the annual NCAA men's basketball media guide, but are listed as unofficial season scoring leaders.

Official

References
General

Specific

NCAA Division I men's basketball statistical leaders